The 2017–18 NBL season was the 35th season for Melbourne United in the NBL, and the 4th under the banner of Melbourne United.

Roster

Preseason

Game log 

|-style="background:#cfc;"
| 1
| 17 May
| @ Jiangsu Dragons
| W 72–85
| Adnam, Wesley (25)
| Tai Wesley (8)
| Kyle Adnam (7)
| Wutaishan Gymnasiumnot available
| 1–0
|-style="background:#cfc;"
| 2
| 19 May
| @ Jiangsu Dragons
| W 56–63
| Majok Majok (16)
| not available 
| not available
| Yancheng Sports Centernot available
| 2–0

|-style="background:#cfc;"
| 3
| 16 July
| China
| W 104–94 (OT)
| Andersen, Moller (20)
| not available
| not available
| Margaret Court Arena6,888
| 3–0

|-style="background:#cfc;"
| 4
| 16 August
| Texas Longhorns
| W 85–75
| Chris Goulding (18)
| Jerry Evans (10)
| not available
| Nunawading Basketball Centre
| 4–0
|-style="background:#cfc;"
| 5
| 20 August
| Wisconsin Badgers
| W 90–89
| Tai Wesley (23)
| not available
| not available
| Casey Stadium1,500
| 5–0

|-style="background:#cfc;"
| 6
| 7 September
| Illawarra
| W 99–83
| Kyle Adnam (24)
| not available
| Kyle Adnam (7)
| Traralgon Sports Stadium3,000
| 6–0
|-style="background:#fcc;"
| 7
| 9 September
| Sydney
| L 99–105
| Tai Wesley (27)
| Josh Boone (9)
| Goulding, Ware (4)
| Traralgon Sports Stadium3,000
| 6–1
|-style="background:#cfc;"
| 8
| 10 September
| Perth
| W 93–67
| Tai Wesley (18)
| Boone, Wesley (7)
| Casper Ware (7)
| State Basketball Centre3,200
| 7–1
|-style="background:#fcc;"
| 9
| 17 September
| @ New Zealand
| L 88–86
| Chris Goulding (18)
| not available
| not available
| TSB Stadium4,560
| 7–2
|-style="background:#cfc;"
| 10
| 19 September
| @ New Zealand
| W 62–101
| Josh Boone (17)
| not available 
| not available 
| ASB Arenanot available
| 8–2

|-style="background:#fcc;"
| 11
| 8 October
| @ Oklahoma City
| L 85–86
| Casper Ware (22)
| Josh Boone (9)
| Casey Prather (5)
| Chesapeake Energy Arena10,203
| 8–3

Regular season

Ladder 

The NBL tie-breaker system as outlined in the NBL Rules and Regulations states that in the case of an identical win–loss record, the overall points percentage between the teams will determine order of seeding.

1Cairns Taipans won on overall points percentage.

Game log 

|-style="background:#cfc;"
| 1
| 5 October
| @ Adelaide
| W 97–99
| Casper Ware (23)
| Josh Boone (10)
| Casper Ware (6)
| Titanium Security Arena6,312
| 1–0
|-style="background:#cfc;"
| 2
| 14 October
| @ Adelaide
| W 79–99
| Kyle Adnam (23)
| Josh Boone (10)
| Casper Ware (6)
| Titanium Security Arenanot available
| 2–0
|-style="background:#fcc;"
| 3
| 20 October
| @ Perth 
| L 89–84
| Casey Prather (16)
| Casey Prather (9)
| Goulding, Ware (3) 
| Perth Arena13,037
| 2–1
|-style="background:#fcc;"
| 4
| 22 October
| New Zealand
| L 76–88
| Josh Boone (22)
| Josh Boone (14)
| Casper Ware (6)
| Hisense Arena10,300
| 2–2
|-style="background:#fcc;"
| 5
| 28 October
| @ Brisbane
| L 87–85
| Casey Prather (30)
| Josh Boone (14)
| Casper Ware (4)
| Carrara Stadiumnot available
| 2–3

|-style="background:#cfc;"
| 6
| 2 November
| Cairns
| W 87–65
| Casper Ware (26)
| Majok Majok (9)
| Prather, Ware (3)
| Hisense Arena6,542
| 3–3
|-style="background:#cfc;"
| 7
| 4 November
| Adelaide
| W 101–82
| Casey Prather (25)
| David Andersen (7)
| Casper Ware (8)
| Hisense Arena8,213
| 4–3
|-style="background:#fcc;"
| 8
| 9 November
| @ Cairns
| L 92–69
| Ware, Wesley (12)
| Casey Prather (6)
| Casey Prather (5)
| Cairns Convention Centre3,891
| 4–4
|-style="background:#cfc;"
| 9
| 11 November
| Sydney
| W 108–90
| Casey Prather (22)
| Josh Boone (13)
| Casper Ware (9)
| Hisense Arena8,196
| 5–4
|-style="background:#fcc;"
| 10
| 19 November
| Perth
| L 59–91
| Casey Prather (20)
| Josh Boone (12)
| Kyle Adnam (2)
| Hisense Arena10,300
| 5–5

|-style="background:#cfc;"
| 11
| 4 December 
| Illawarra
| W 91–73
| Casey Prather (18)
| Josh Boone (14)
| Tai Wesley (8)
| Hisense Arena6,054
| 6–5
|-style="background:#fcc;"
| 12
| 9 December
| @ Cairns
| 79–70
| Tai Wesley (20)
| Josh Boone (8)
| Casper Ware (4)
| Cairns Convention Centre4,151
| 6–6
|-style="background:#cfc;"
| 13
| 11 December
| Sydney
| W 95–69
| Chris Goulding (23)
| Josh Boone (17)
| Casper Ware (7)
| Hisense Arena8,194
| 7–6
|-style="background:#cfc;"
| 14
| 16 December
| @ Illawarra
| W 78–84
| Tai Wesley (19)
| Josh Boone (10)
| Tai Wesley (8)
| WIN Entertainment Centre2,150
| 8–6
|-style="background:#cfc;"
| 15
| 22 December
| Adelaide
| W 99–91
| Casper Ware (24)
| Josh Boone (12)
| Casper Ware (5)
| Hisense Arena8,089
| 9–6
|-style="background:#cfc;"
| 16
| 26 December
| Brisbane
| W 69–68
| David Andersen (15)
| Josh Boone (11)
| Tai Wesley (3)
| Hisense Arena10,300
| 10–6
|-style="background:#cfc;"
| 17
| 30 December
| @ Sydney
| W 79–103
| Casper Ware (26)
| Tai Wesley (8)
| Goulding, Ware (5)
| Qudos Bank Arena6,014
| 11–6

|-style="background:#cfc;"
| 18
| 6 January
| @ Illawarra
| W 77–79
| Chris Goulding (22)
| Carrick Felix (10)
| Casper Ware (5)
| WIN Entertainment Centre2,869
| 12–6
|-style="background:#cfc;"
| 19
| 12 January
| @ Perth
| W 80–82
| Tai Wesley (21)
| Tai Wesley (10)
| Tai Wesley (5)
| Perth Arena13,611
| 13–6
|-style="background:#fcc;"
| 20
| 18 January
| @ New Zealand
| L 98–81
| Chris Goulding (21)
| Josh Boone (7)
| Casper Ware (5)
| North Shore Events Centrenot available 
| 13–7
|-style="background:#cfc;"
| 21
| 20 January
| @ Brisbane
| W 95–103
| Casper Ware (22)
| Ware, Wesley (5) 
| Tai Wesley (8)
| Brisbane Entertainment Centre4,650
| 14–7
|-style="background:#cfc;"
| 22
| 24 January
| Cairns
| W 79–68
| Casper Ware (24)
| Josh Boone (9)
| Chris Goulding (6)
| Hisense Arena7,306
| 15–7
|-style="background:#cfc;"
| 23
| 28 January
| @ Sydney
| W 76–93
| Josh Boone (22)
| Josh Boone (13)
| Casper Ware (4)
| Qudos Bank Arena7,407
| 16–7

|-style="background:#cfc;"
| 24
| 3 February
| Brisbane
| W 69–61
| Casper Ware (17)
| Josh Boone (12)
| Tai Wesley (5)
| Hisense Arena10,300
| 17–7
|-style="background:#cfc;"
| 25
| 9 February
| New Zealand
| W 89–83
| Casper Ware (26)
| Josh Boone (12)
| Casper Ware (5)
| Hisense Arena7,256
| 18–7
|-style="background:#cfc;"
| 26
| 11 February
| @ New Zealand
| W 82–100
| Chris Goulding (21)
| Barlow, Boone (7)
| Casper Ware (9)
| Spark Arena5,000 
| 19–7
|-style="background:#cfc;"
| 27
| 16 February
| Perth
| W 97–85
| Goulding, Ware (19)
| Josh Boone (10)
| Craig Moller (4)
| Hisense Arena7,064
| 20–7
|-style="background:#fcc;"
| 28
| 18 February
| Illawarra
| L 84–94
| Boone, Wesley (14)
| Casey Prather (6)
| Casper Ware (6)
| Hisense Arena7,981
| 20–8

Postseason 

|-style="background:#cfc;"
| 1
| 3 March
| New Zealand
| W 88–77
| Casper Ware (33)
| Josh Boone (8)
| Tai Wesley (4)
| Hisense Arena6,833
| 1–0
|-style="background:#cfc;"
| 2
| 5 March
| @ New Zealand
| W 86–88 (OT)
| Josh Boone (33)
| Josh Boone (15)
| Casper Ware (6)
| Spark Arenanot available 
| 2–0

|-style="background:#cfc;"
| 1
| 16 March
| Adelaide
| W 107–96
| Chris Goulding (26)
| Boone, Wesley (7)
| Tai Wesley (6)
| Hisense Arena8,699
| 1–0
|-style="background:#fcc;"
| 2
| 18 March
| @ Adelaide
| L 110–95
| Casey Prather (20)
| Casey Prather (7)
| Chris Goulding (3)
| Titanium Security Arena7,000
| 1–1
|-style="background:#cfc;"
| 3
| 23 March
| Adelaide
| W 101–98
| Casper Ware (25)
| Casey Prather (6)
| Casper Ware (3)
| Hisense Arena9,362
| 2–1
|-style="background:#fcc;"
| 4
| 25 March 
| @ Adelaide
| L 90–81
| Casey Prather (23)
| Casey Prather (7)
| Chris Goulding (4)
| Titanium Security Arena7,500
| 2–2
|-style="background:#cfc;"
| 5
| 31 March 
| Adelaide
| W 100–82
| Goulding, Ware (23)
| Josh Boone (12)
| Tai Wesley (3)
| Hisense Arena10,300
| 3–2

Transactions

Re-signed

Additions

Subtractions

Awards

NBL Awards 
 All-NBL First Team: Josh Boone & Casper Ware

 All-NBL Second Team: Tai Wesley

 Coach of the Year: Dean Vickerman

Melbourne United Awards 
 Most Valuable Player: Casper Ware

 Best Defensive Player: Josh Boone

 Coaches Award: Chris Goulding

 Most Improved: Tai Wesley

 Best Club Person Award: Andrew Kidd

Finals Series 
 Grand Final MVP: Chris Goulding

See also 

 2017–18 NBL season
 Melbourne United

References

External links 

 Official Website

Melbourne United
Melbourne United seasons
Melbourne United season